Lotti Huber (16 October 1912 - 31 May 1998) was a German actress. She appeared in more than twenty films from 1978 to 1999. She became famous in Germany for her roles in Rosa von Praunheim's films.

Selected filmography

References

External links 

1912 births
1998 deaths
20th-century German actresses
German film actresses